Ma Qun (born 8 February 1994) is a Chinese athlete specialising in the javelin throw. He won a bronze medal at the 2019 Summer Universiade.

His personal best in the event is 82.46 metres set in Guiyang in 2018.

International competitions

References

1994 births
Living people
Chinese male javelin throwers
Athletes (track and field) at the 2018 Asian Games
Medalists at the 2019 Summer Universiade
Universiade bronze medalists for China
Universiade medalists in athletics (track and field)
Asian Games competitors for China
21st-century Chinese people